The 2016 Duck Commander 500 was a NASCAR Sprint Cup Series race held on April 9, 2016, at Texas Motor Speedway in Fort Worth, Texas. Contested over 334 laps on the 1.5-mile (2.4 km) intermediate quad-oval, it was the seventh race of the 2016 NASCAR Sprint Cup Series season, The race had 17 lead changes among different drivers and 7 cautions for 41 laps.

Report

Background

Texas Motor Speedway is a speedway located in the northernmost portion of the U.S. city of Fort Worth, Texas – the portion located in Denton County, Texas. The track measures  around and is banked 24 degrees in the turns, and is of the oval design, where the front straightaway juts outward slightly. The track layout is similar to Atlanta Motor Speedway and Charlotte Motor Speedway (formerly Lowe's Motor Speedway). The track is owned by Speedway Motorsports, Inc., the same company that owns Atlanta and Charlotte Motor Speedways, as well as the short-track Bristol Motor Speedway.

Entry list
The entry list for the Duck Commander 500 was released on Monday, April 4 at 10:12 a.m. Eastern time. Forty cars were entered for the race.

First practice

Qualifying

He said after the session that he sure does "like it here, I really enjoy Texas. I have a lot of friends here. This is a fun place to race. The tire, I don’t know what the other guys feel, the tire and downforce package for me lets me feel like I can go into the corner and move around and feel the tire underneath me. Even in qualifying, there were times when I got a little sideways and it slid a little bit and I could recover and that’s really fun as a race car driver. Hopefully the race goes well. We have some practice later. I just cannot thank my guys on this Stanley Tools Camry enough, they are unbelievable.” After qualifying second, Joey Logano said that he was "really good in (Turns) 1 and 2. That's where we beating the 19. And then I went in there the last time, and it didn't turn like it was, and I was like, "Oh, no, that's our good area…’ We actually fixed 3 and 4, and we were pretty good down there. But we kind of flip-flopped, and we needed both... Just (with) another run on the tires, it's so hard to go faster at this track."

Qualifying results

Final practice

Race

First half

Start

Because of rain during the day, the race started under a green/yellow condition (the race started under caution, but the laps began counting) at 9:35 p.m. The race began under the first caution of the night. Carl Edwards led the field to the green flag on lap 6. Martin Truex Jr., who was running second after six laps, fell back to third after his grille was covered by a piece of debris. He tried to pull up to the rear of Joey Logano, but the debris remained. He then fell behind Denny Hamlin and managed to get the debris off. The second caution of the race flew on lap 29. This was a scheduled competition caution due to rain. On pit road, Jimmie Johnson slammed into the rear of Kyle Busch and partly caved in the nose of his car. David Ragan opted not to pit and assumed the race lead. He would eventually pit and hand the lead back to Edwards.

The race restarted on lap 34. Truex passed Edwards exiting turn 4 to take the lead on lap 60. A number of cars began pitting under green on lap 73. Truex gave up the lead to pit on lap 74 and handed the lead to Matt Kenseth. He pitted the next lap and handed the lead to Chase Elliott, who was also making his pit stop. The lead cycled back to Truex.

Second quarter
Truex continued to pull away from the field as he pulled to a five-second lead by lap 100. A number of cars began pitting under green on lap 111. Truex ducked onto pit road on lap 112 and handed the lead to Busch. Brian Vickers, in what ended up being his last ever NASCAR start, spun out trying to enter pit road. He continued on and the race remained green. Unfortunately, he and Josh Wise were tagged for a commitment line violation and were forced to serve a pass-through penalty. Busch pitted the next lap and the lead cycled back to Truex.

Paul Menard was black-flagged for the corner panel being pulled out and was forced to pit to fix it on lap 128. Brad Keselowski made an unscheduled stop the next lap for a loose wheel. Debris in turn 4 brought out the third caution of the race on lap 134. Edwards exited pit road with the race lead.

The race restarted on lap 142. Truex ducked onto pit road on lap 177 and handed the lead to Busch. He pitted the next lap and handed the lead to Elliott. He pitted the next lap and the lead cycled back to Edwards.

Second half

Halfway
Truex drove under Edwards to retake the lead on lap 208. The fourth caution of the race flew on lap 210 for a single-car wreck in turn 4. Rounding turn 3, Wise suffered a right-front tire blowout and slammed the wall. He would go on to finish 40th. Kenseth opted not to pit under the caution and assumed the lead. Kevin Harvick was tagged for speeding and an uncontrolled tire and restarted the race from the tail-end of the field.

The race restarted on lap 222. Edwards, who restarted second, made an unscheduled stop the next lap for a loose wheel. He rejoined the race in 19th one lap down. Truex passed Kenseth going into turn 3 to retake the lead on lap 236. A number of cars began hitting pit road with 78 laps to go. Truex pitted with 76 laps to go and handed the lead to Trevor Bayne. He tried to extend his fuel run, but was chased down and passed by Truex for the lead.

Fourth quarter
Debris on the front stretch brought out the fifth caution of the race with 58 laps to go.

The race restarted with 50 laps to go. The sixth caution of the race flew with 47 laps to go for a single-car wreck in turn 2. Rounding turn 1, Kasey Kahne tapped the left-rear corner of Greg Biffle, got him loose and sent him into the wall.

The race restarted with 42 laps to go. The seventh caution of the race flew with 41 laps to go for a multi-car wreck on the backstretch. Exiting turn 2, Johnson made contact with the rear-end of Austin Dillon and sent him sliding into the wall. Dillon overcorrected and hit the outside wall with the right-front of his car. His car turned down the track, was clipped by Ricky Stenhouse Jr., slid down and tapped the inside wall. With a number of cars trying to avoid the spinning No. 3 car, an accordion-effect led to more cars being caught up in the melee. A total of 13 cars sustained damage in the wreck. Dillon said afterwards that being on older tires, he "was trying to get all I could there. It’s part of trying to win a race. We put ourselves in a position to be out front, thinking that two laps wouldn’t mean much, but it did. That’s part of it. The good Lord kept me safe tonight and gave me a good race car. You have to be gracious in defeat. We’ll come back next week with another fast car and hopefully we can do the same thing we did today, and that’s run up front."

The race restarted with 33 laps to go. Busch drove by him on the backstretch to take the lead with 32 laps to go and drove on to score the victory.

Post-race

Driver comments
Busch said after the race that life is "pretty darn good, I’ll tell you that. I’ve got a great wife, a great son and I’m having a blast, living the dream with Adam Stevens (crew chief) and these guys, and Joe (Gibbs, JGR owner) and JD (Gibbs, JGR co-chairman), thinking about you guys back at home and of course Coy (Gibbs, JGR COO) is here with us. Everybody back at the shop has been building great race cars, they’ve been doing a great job for us. The crew chiefs here have been really working together, gelling together and putting everything together. It’s just fun, right now it’s all clicking and going together.”

After a runner-up finish, Dale Earnhardt Jr. said that "we need a win. We'd love to get a win. I know our fans want a win real bad. Trust me, man, we're all working real hard. We're running great every week. So at least that's hopefully fun to watch for you guys. I had a blast inside the car, lot of sliding around, sideways -- good, hard racing. We'll go to the next one, I guess, and try again."

After finishing third, Logano said he was "proud of what my race team did. This Shell/Pennzoil team executed perfectly today. We may not have had the fastest car, we obviously didn’t have the fastest car, but we executed into a top-three finish, and I’m very proud of my team for that. We had great pit stops and great calls, so everything worked out well. Everyone did their job. That’s kind of been our weak point this year is that we haven’t had the speed, but we haven’t been executing perfectly. Now it seemed like we executed right and we’ve got to work on our speed now.”

Not satisfied with a career best fifth-place finish, Elliott said that running in "fifth isn't a contender. You've got to be running higher. We'll keep working on it."

After leading 142 of the 334 laps, Truex described finishing sixth as "frustrating." He also added that the way it turned out "hurts a little bit and move on and we'll take the positives out of tonight."

Race results

Race summary
 Lead changes: 17
 Cautions/Laps: 7 for 41
 Red flags: 0
 Time of race: 3 hours, 37 minutes and 16 seconds
 Average speed:

Media

Television
Fox Sports covered their 16th race at the Texas Motor Speedway. Mike Joy, 2009 race winner Jeff Gordon and Darrell Waltrip had the call in the booth for the race. Jamie Little, Vince Welch and Matt Yocum handled the pit road duties for the television side.

Radio
The race was broadcast on radio by the Performance Racing Network and simulcast on Sirius XM NASCAR Radio. Doug Rice, Mark Garrow and Wendy Venturini called the race from the booth when the field raced down the front stretch. Rob Albright called the race from atop a billboard outside of turn 2 when the field raced through turns 1 and 2. Pat Patterson called the race from a billboard outside of turn 3 when the field raced through turns 3 and 4. On pit road, PRN was manned by Brad Gillie, Brett McMillan, Jim Noble and Steve Richards.

Standings after the race

Drivers' Championship standings

Manufacturers' Championship standings

Note: Only the first 16 positions are included for the driver standings.. – Driver has clinched a Chase position.

Note

References

Duck Commander 500
Duck Commander 500
2010s in Fort Worth, Texas
NASCAR races at Texas Motor Speedway
Duck Commander 500